The Rays of Grace Academy is a Ugandan association football academy based in Njeru Municipality of Buikwe District.  Rays of Grace Academy were crowned the inaugural winners of the FUFA Primary Schools championship Odilo Champions in  August 2019 as well in 2022 they defended the title emerging the winners of the 2022 edition.

History
The Rays of Grace Academy was established in 2015 by Robert Kiwanuka.  In September 2014, he started a school, which is now home to 593 pupils, 50 of whom are registered under their football academy which is recognized by the Uganda Youth Football Association (UYFA).

The academy comprises over 367 registered students aged between 6–18 years and operates throughout the year from 1 training centre which is found in Mukono (2022).   Footballers who started their careers at the academy include Travis Mutyaba, Issa Bugembe, Elvis Ssekajugo.

In 2022, Rays of Grace Academy represented Uganda at the Federation of East Africa Secondary Schools Sports Association in Arusha, Tanzania.

Notable players
 Travis Mutyaba 
 Issa Bugembe
 Vicent Mulema 
 Elvis Ssekajugo
 Arafat Nkoola
 Leonard Kasanya

References

External links
 Uganda’s Rays of Grace Academy, Bombo UMEA win U-16 boys & girls football | FEASSSA Games 2022
 Rays of Grace Academy Archives
 Rays Of Grace Undergoes FUFA Pro Agenda
 Rays Of Grace, Bombo UMEA, Nakirebe Present FEASSSA trophies To USSSA President -
 https://kawowo.com/2022/09/09/how-rays-of-grace-successfully-defended-primary-schools-football-title/

Football academies in Africa
Football clubs in Uganda